Edward M. "Eddie" Wold (born 1951) is an American professional bridge player from Houston, Texas. Wold is a graduate of Rice University.  Wold is an accomplished teacher and plays regularly at Houston's Westside Bridge Academy, particularly in that club's Saturday afternoon "common game," where over a thousand pairs from all over the country play identical boards (the same cards).

Bridge accomplishments

Awards

 Herman Trophy (1) 1990
 Mott-Smith Trophy (3) 1989, 1998, 2005

Wins

 North American Bridge Championships (15)
 Silodor Open Pairs (1) 2005 
 Grand National Teams (2) 1977, 1981 
 Jacoby Open Swiss Teams (1) 1991 
 Vanderbilt (2) 1979, 1982 
 Senior Knockout Teams (1) 2010 
 Keohane North American Swiss Teams (1) 2008 
 Mitchell Board-a-Match Teams (2) 1984, 1987 
 Chicago Mixed Board-a-Match (1) 1990 
 Reisinger (2) 1985, 2003 
 Spingold (2) 1977, 1984

Runners-up

 North American Bridge Championships
 von Zedtwitz Life Master Pairs (1) 1994 
 Wernher Open Pairs (1) 1993 
 Grand National Teams (2) 1998, 2004 
 Jacoby Open Swiss Teams (2) 1998, 2011 
 Truscott Senior Swiss Teams (1) 2011 
 Senior Knockout Teams (1) 2011 
 Keohane North American Swiss Teams (2) 2006, 2022 
 Mitchell Board-a-Match Teams (2) 1990, 2000 
 Chicago Mixed Board-a-Match (3) 1984, 1994, 2003 
 Reisinger (3) 1980, 1990, 1997 
 Roth Open Swiss Teams (1) 2009

Notes

External links
 

Living people
American contract bridge players
1951 births
Date of birth missing (living people)
Place of birth missing (living people)
People from Houston
Rice University alumni